Rabbath may refer to:

Rabbath Ammon
Rabbath Moab
 François Rabbath (born 1931), French double-bass player
 Jean-Claude Rabbath (born 1977), High jumper
 F.C. Rabbath (born 1986), American inventor, Filmmaker